Trapped in a Forest Fire is a 1913 American silent short film directed by Gilbert P. Hamilton starring Charlotte Burton, Sydney Ayres, Jacques Jaccard, Violt Neitz, Louise Lester, Jack Richardson, Vivian Rich, and Harry von Meter.

Cast
Sydney Ayres - Robert Newton
Vivian Rich - Vera Redmond
Harry von Meter - Thomas Nevins
Charlotte Burton - Inez Tremain
Jack Richardson - Jack Graham
Violet Knights -Sally Stanton (*Violet Neitz)
Jacques Jaccard - James Redmond
Louise Lester - Mrs. Newton, Robert's Mother

See also
List of firefighting films

References

External links

1913 films
American silent short films
American black-and-white films
Films about firefighting
American romantic drama films
1913 romantic drama films
Films directed by Gilbert P. Hamilton
Films about wildfires
1910s American films
Silent romantic drama films
Silent American drama films